Standish John Cagney (29 June 1900 – 9 May 1962) was a rugby union player. He played thirteen tests for the Ireland national rugby union team. His club team was London Irish RFC.

References

1900 births
1962 deaths
Irish rugby union players
Ireland international rugby union players
London Irish players